Parliamentary elections were held in Burundi on 10 May 1965, the first since independence in 1962. Voters elected the National Assembly, which had been reduced from 64 to 33 seats. They followed the assassination of Prime Minister Pierre Ngendandumwe on 15 January 1965, and were won by the ruling Union for National Progress.

Results

National Assembly

Senate
Following the National Assembly elections, the 16-member Senate was filled. Eight members of the Senate were elected by the members of the National Assembly, all of which were UPRONA members. The eight Senate members elected a further four members, with a further four appointed by the King.

Aftermath
Despite the decisive victory by Hutu candidates in the election, King Mwambutsa IV appointed a Tutsi prince, Léopold Biha, as Prime Minister.

Tensions finally erupted into violence following an attempted coup by Hutu army officers in October 1965. The failed coup was followed by a major purge of Hutus in the armed forces. Hutu politicians and civilians were also killed. The following year Mwambutsa was overthrown by his son, Ntare V, who was deposed in a military coup later in the year, ending the country's monarchy.

References

Elections in Burundi
Burundi
1965 in Burundi
Election and referendum articles with incomplete results